Sail Training International (STI) is a non-profit international sail training organisation, with members in 29 countries. Its main aim is the "development and education of young people of all nations, cultures, and social backgrounds through the experience of sail training.". It is based in Hampshire in the United Kingdom and is a registered charity.

The organization organizes various activities such as regattas, seminars or conferences on the subject of "Sail Training". Sail Training International is best known for organizing the Tall Ships' Races, which are now followed and/or attended by hundreds of thousands of onlookers each year.

The Tall Ships Races

Sail Training International runs the annual Tall Ships' Races in Europe and the north Atlantic which attract a fleet of up to 130 sail training vessels and draws millions of visitors to European ports.

Other activities
Besides organising the Tall Ships' Races, STI is a provider of races and events, conferences and seminars, publications, research and services for the international sail training community. In 2014 they launched an International Sail Endorsement Scheme together with the Nautical Institute.

History
In 1956, the Sail Training International Race Committee (STIRC) was formed in the United Kingdom to organize a unique international tall ships' regatta. Due to the popularity of the regatta with the public and participating vessels, the first regatta evolved into the regular Tall Ships' Races (1973-2003 under the name Cutty Sark Tall Ships' Races), which continued to be organized by the STIRC. It was later succeeded by the British Sail Training Association or the International Sail Training Association (ISTA), a wholly owned subsidiary of the British Sail Training Association, whose role was to continue to organize the Tall Ships' Races.

Today's Sail Training International was formed in 2002 by the 20 Sail Training Associations and organizations that exist around the world and promote the idea of Sail Training nationwide, to transfer ISTA's duties to a new and independent organization - one owned and controlled by the STAs of the various states.[4] Sail Training International took over ISTA's property, employees and contracts with regatta and event ports a few months after its formation.

Co-founding National Sail Training Organizations were those of Australia, Belgium, Bermuda, Canada, Denmark, Finland, Germany, Ireland, Italy, Latvia, the Netherlands, New Zealand, Norway, Poland, Portugal, Russia, Spain, Sweden, the United Kingdom, and the United States of America. Since 2003 Sail Training International has been recognized as a non-profit organization.

Members
Members of STI are the national sail training associations of:

 Australia (Australian Sail Training Association, AUSTA)
 Belgium (Sail Training Association Belgium)
 Bermuda (Sail Training Association Bermuda)
 Canada (Canadian Sail Training Association)
 China (China Sail Training Association)]
 Czech Republic (probationary member)
 Croatia (probationary member)
 Denmark
 Estonia (probationary member)
 Finland
 France (Amis des Grands Voiliers)
 Germany
 Greece
 Hungary (probationary member)
 India
 Ireland 
 Italy
 Japan (probationary member)
 Latvia
 Lithuania
 Netherlands
 New Zealand
 Norway
 Poland
 Portugal
 South Africa
 Spain
 Sweden
 Turkey
 United Kingdom (Association of Sail Training Organisations
 United States of America (American Sail Training Association)

Honours 
In 2007 Sail Training International was nominated for the Nobel Peace Prize for its work in promoting international understanding and friendship.

See also
 List of tall ships

Literature 
 Tall Ships Today: Their remarkable story, Adlard Coles Trade, 2014, 
 Tall Ships Handbook, Amberley, 2014,

References

External links
 Sail Training International website

International charities
Tall ships
Sail training associations
Charities based in Hampshire
Youth organisations based in the United Kingdom
Yachting associations
2002 establishments in the United Kingdom
Sports organizations established in 2002